In algebraic number theory, a fundamental unit is a generator (modulo the roots of unity) for the unit group of the ring of integers of a number field, when that group has rank 1 (i.e. when the unit group modulo its torsion subgroup is infinite cyclic). Dirichlet's unit theorem shows that the unit group has rank 1 exactly when the number field is a real quadratic field, a complex cubic field, or a totally imaginary quartic field. When the unit group has rank ≥ 1, a basis of it modulo its torsion is called a fundamental system of units. Some authors use the term fundamental unit to mean any element of a fundamental system of units, not restricting to the case of rank 1 (e.g. ).

Real quadratic fields
For the real quadratic field  (with d square-free), the fundamental unit ε is commonly normalized so that  (as a real number). Then it is uniquely characterized as the minimal unit among those that are greater than 1. If Δ denotes the discriminant of K, then the fundamental unit is

where (a, b) is the smallest solution to

in positive integers.

A simpler relation can be obtained using congruences: if Δ is divisible by a prime that is congruent to 3 modulo 4, then K does not have a unit of norm −1. However, the converse does not hold as shown by the example d = 34. In the early 1990s, Peter Stevenhagen proposed a probabilistic model that led him to a conjecture on how often the converse fails. Specifically, if D(X) is the number of real quadratic fields whose discriminant Δ < X is not divisible by a prime congruent to 3 modulo 4 and D−(X) is those who have a unit of norm −1, then

In other words, the converse fails about 42% of the time. As of March 2012, a recent result towards this conjecture was provided by Étienne Fouvry and Jürgen Klüners who show that the converse fails between 33% and 59% of the time.  In 2022, Peter Koymans and Carlo Pagano claimed a complete proof of Stevenhagen's conjecture.

Cubic fields
If K is a complex cubic field then it has a unique real embedding and the fundamental unit ε can be picked uniquely such that |ε| > 1 in this embedding. If the discriminant Δ of K satisfies |Δ| ≥ 33, then

so .

Notes

References

External links
 

Algebraic number theory